Pilon is a French surname that may refer to the following notable people:
 Antoine Olivier Pilon (born 1997), Canadian actor
 Benoît Pilon (born 1962), francophone Canadian director and screenwriter
 Bernard Pilon (1918–1970), Canadian insurance broker and politician
 Daniel Pilon (1940–2018), Canadian-born actor
 Donald Pilon (disambiguation), multiple people
 Fletcher Pilon (born 2001), Australian acoustic singer and songwriter
 François Pilon (born 1958), Canadian politician 
 Frederick Pilon (1750–1788), Irish actor and dramatist
 Garrett Pilon (born 1998), American-born Canadian ice hockey centre
 Germain Pilon (c.1537–1590), French Renaissance sculptor 
 Hormisdas Pilon (1857–1937), Canadian politician
 Jean-Guy Pilon (1930–2021), Canadian poet
 Jeff Pilon (born 1976), Canadian gridiron football offensive tackle
 Joseph Pilon (1826–1909), Canadian farmer, merchant and political figure 
 Juliana Geran Pilon, contemporary Romanian-born American political scientist and writer
 Marie-Josée Arès-Pilon (born 1982), weightlifter competing for Canada
 Mary Pilon (born 1986), American journalist
 Nathan Pilon (born 1976), Australian cricketer
 Nicolas J-L Pilon, Canadian Army officer
 Ray Pilon (born 1945), American politician
 Rich Pilon (born 1968), retired NHL ice hockey player
 Roger Pilon (born 1942), American libertarian legal theorist
 Veno Pilon (1896–1970), Slovene expressionist painter, graphic artist and photographer
 Victor Pilon (born 1958), Canadian theatre designer, visual designer and photographer

French-language surnames